Lê Dinh (1934 – 9 November 2020) was a Vietnamese-Canadian songwriter. From 1957–1975 he worked at Radio Saigon. In 1978 he emigrated, via Taiwan to Montreal. He criticized the sterility of Socialist music since 1975.

References

External links
 

1934 births
Vietnamese composers
2020 deaths
Vietnamese emigrants to Canada
Date of birth missing
Place of birth missing